The four tones of Chinese poetry and dialectology are four traditional tone classes of Chinese words. They play an important role in Chinese poetry and in comparative studies of tonal development in the modern varieties of Chinese, both in traditional Chinese and in Western linguistics. They correspond to the phonology of Middle Chinese, and are named even or level ( píng), rising ( shǎng), departing or going ( qù), and entering or checked ( rù). (The last three are collectively referred to as oblique  (zè), an important concept in poetic tone patterns.) They were reconstructed as mid (˧ or 33), mid rising (˧˥ or 35), high falling (˥˩ or 51), and mid (˧ or 33) with a final stop consonant respectively. Due to historic splits and mergers, none of the modern varieties of Chinese have the exact four tones of Middle Chinese, but they are noted in rhyming dictionaries.

Background
According to the usual modern analysis, Early Middle Chinese had three phonemic tones in most syllables, but no tonal distinctions in checked syllables ending in the stop consonants /p/, /t/, /k/. In most circumstances, every syllable had its own tone; hence a multisyllabic word typically had a tone assigned to each syllable. (In modern varieties, the situation is sometimes more complicated. Although each syllable typically still has its own underlying tone in most dialects, some syllables in the speech of some varieties may have their tone modified into other tones or neutralized entirely, by a process known as tone sandhi. Furthermore, many varieties of Chinese deleted Middle Chinese final consonants, but these contrasts may have been preserved, helping lead to tonogenesis of contemporary multitonal systems.)

Traditional Chinese dialectology reckons syllables ending in a stop consonant as possessing a fourth tone, known technically as a checked tone. This tone is known in traditional Chinese linguistics as the entering ( rù) tone, a term commonly used in English as well. The other three tones were termed the level (or even) tone ( píng), the rising ( shǎng) tone, and the departing (or going) tone ( qù). The practice of setting up the entering tone as a separate class reflects the fact that the actual pitch contour of checked syllables was quite distinct from the pitch contour of any of the sonorant-final syllables. Indeed, implicit in the organisation of the classical rime tables is a different, but structurally equally valid, phonemic analysis, which takes all four tones as phonemic and demotes the difference between stop finals  and nasal finals  to allophonic, with stops occurring in entering syllables and nasals elsewhere.

From the perspective of modern historical linguistics, there is often value in treating the entering tone as a tone regardless of its phonemic status, because syllables possessing this tone typically develop differently from syllables possessing any of the other three tones. For clarity, these four tones are often referred to as tone classes, with each word belonging to one of the four tone classes. This reflects the fact that the lexical division of words into tone classes is based on tone, but not all tone classes necessarily have a distinct phonemic tone associated with them. Some contemporary fāngyán such as Taiwanese Hokkien, Jin and Penang are said to preserve the entering tone, which is used as a marker to differentiate them from other varieties and also genetically classify them via the comparative method.

The four Early Middle Chinese (EMC) tones are nearly always presented in the order level ( píng), rising ( shǎng), departing ( qù), entering ( rù), and correspondingly numbered 1 2 3 4 in modern discussions. In Late Middle Chinese (LMC), each of the EMC tone classes split in two, depending on the nature of the initial consonant of the syllable in question. Discussions of LMC and the various modern varieties will often number these split tone classes from 1 through 8, keeping the same ordering as before. For example, LMC/modern tone classes 1 and 2 derive from EMC tone class 1; LMC/modern tone classes 3 and 4 derive from EMC tone class 2; etc. The odd-numbered tone classes 1 3 5 7 are termed dark ( yīn), whereas the even-numbered tone classes 2 4 6 8 are termed light ( yáng). Hence, for example, LMC/modern tone class 5 is known in Chinese as the yīn qù (dark departing) tone, indicating that it is the yīn variant of the EMC qù tone (EMC tone 3). In order to clarify the relationship between the EMC and LMC tone classes, some authors notate the LMC tone classes as 1a 1b 2a 2b 3a 3b 4a 4b in place of 1 2 3 4 5 6 7 8, where a and b correspond directly to Chinese yīn and yáng, respectively.

Names
In Middle Chinese, each of the tone names carries the tone it identifies:  level ꜁,  rising ꜃,  departing ꜄, and  entering ꜇. However, in some modern Chinese varieties, this is no longer true.

In modern Chinese varieties, tones that derive from the four Middle Chinese tone classes may be split into two registers, dark ( yīn) and light ( yáng) depending on whether the Middle Chinese onset was voiceless or voiced, respectively. When all four tone classes split, eight tones result: dark level, light level, dark rising, light rising, dark departing, light departing, dark entering, and light entering. Sometimes these have been termed upper and lower registers respectively, but that may be a misnomer, as in some dialects the dark registers may have the lower tone, and the light register the higher tone.

Chinese dictionaries mark the tones with diacritical marks at the four corners of a character:  level,  rising,  departing, and  entering. When yin and yang tones are distinguished, these are the diacritics for the yin (dark) tones; the yang (light) tones are indicated by underscoring the diacritic:  light level,  light rising,  light departing,  light entering. These diacritics are also sometimes used when the phonetic realization is unknown, as in the reconstructions of Middle Chinese at the beginning of this section. However, in this article, the circled numbers ①②③④⑤⑥⑦⑧ will be used, as in the table below, with the odd numbers ①③⑤⑦ indicating either 'dark' tones or tones that have not split, and even numbers ②④⑥⑧ indicating 'light' tones. Thus, level tones are numbered ①②, the rising tones ③④, the departing tones ⑤⑥, and the entering (checked) tones ⑦⑧.

In Yue (incl. Cantonese) the dark entering tone further splits into high and low registers, depending on the length of the nucleus, for a total of nine tone classes. Some dialects have a complex tone splittings, and the terms dark and light are insufficient to cover the possibilities.

The number of tone classes is based on Chinese tradition, and is as much register as it is actual tone. The entering 'tones', for example, are distinct only because they are checked by a final stop consonant, not because they have a tone contour that contrasts with non-entering tones. In dialects such as Shanghainese, tone classes are numbered even if they are not phonemically distinct.

Origin

The tonal aspect of Chinese dialects that is so important today is believed by some linguists to have been absent from Old Chinese, but rather came about in Early Middle Chinese after the loss of various finals. The four tones of Middle Chinese,  píng level,  shǎng rising,  qù departing, and  rù entering, all evolved from different final losses from Old Chinese. The , or rising tone, arose from the loss of glottal stops at the end of words. Support for this can be seen in Buddhist transcriptions of the Han period, where the rising tone was often used to note Sanskrit short vowels, and also in loans of words with final  in the source language, which were borrowed into Chinese as shǎng tone. The glottal stop even survives in some Min and Hakka dialects, either as a phonetic glottal stop, a short creaky vowel, or denasalization, which for example the final -ng of Old Chinese has changed to modern  in shang-tone words. This evolution of final glottal stop into a rising tone is similar to what happened in Vietnamese, another tonal language. The , or departing tone, arose from the loss of [-s] at the end of words. Support for this theory is found when examining Chinese loans into neighbouring East Asian languages. For example, in Korean, the word for comb, pis, is a loan of the Chinese word bì , which means that when the word comb was borrowed into Korean, there was still an [-s] sound at the end of the word that later disappeared from Chinese and gave rise to a departing  tone. The , or entering tone consisted of words ending in voiceless stops, [-p], [-t], and [-k].

Distribution in modern Chinese
Sample dialects and their realization of tone are given below.

Different authors typically have different opinions as to the shapes of Chinese tones. Tones typically have a slight purely phonetic drop at the end in citation form. It is therefore likely that a tone with a drop of one unit (54, say, or 21) is not distinct from a level tone (a 55 or 22); on the other hand, what one author hears as a significant drop (53 or 31) may be perceived by another as a smaller drop so it is often ambiguous whether a transcription like 54 or 21 is a level or contour tone. Similarly, a slight drop before a rise, such as a 214, may be from the speaker approaching the target tone and so may also not be distinctive (from 14).

See also
 Four tones (Mandarin Chinese), the modern outcome of the development of these tones in Standard Mandarin
 Proto-Tai language#Tones, a similar set of tones in a non-Chinese language

References

Further reading

Phonetics
Chinese language
Middle Chinese

de:Mittelchinesisch#Töne